Alabukhino is a rural locality (a village) in Karinskoye Rural Settlement, Alexandrovsky District, Vladimir Oblast, Russia. The population was 7 as of 2010. There is 1 street.

Geography 
Alabukhino is located on the left bank of the Vzderinozhka River, 18 km southeast of Alexandrov (the district's administrative centre) by road. Kovedyayevo is the nearest rural locality.

References 

Rural localities in Alexandrovsky District, Vladimir Oblast
Alexandrovsky Uyezd (Vladimir Governorate)